Songun is the "military-first" policy of North Korea, prioritizing the Korean People's Army in the affairs of state and allocation of resources. "Military-first" as a principle guides political and economic life in North Korea, with "military-first politics" dominating the political system; "a line of military-first economic construction" acting as an economic system; and "military-first ideology" serving as the guiding ideology.

Songun elevates the Korean People's Army within North Korea as an organization and as a state function, granting it the primary position in the North Korean government and society. It guides domestic policy and international interactions. It is the framework for the government, designating the military as the "supreme repository of power". The government grants the Korean People's Army the highest economic and resource-allocation priority and positions it as the model for society to emulate. Songun is also the ideological concept behind a shift in policies since 1994 which emphasize the people's military over all other aspects of state and society.

History 

The roots of  can be traced back to Kim Il-sung's guerilla activities against the Japanese during the 1930s. During this time, Kim Il-sung came to believe that a nation's independence, sovereignty, and prosperity were dependent on the existence of an organized and well-armed fighting force.

The policy aimed to arm the entire population, fortify the state, educate every soldier to become a party cadre, and modernize the military.

 did not appear as an official government policy until after Kim Il-sung's death in 1994. In the wake of his first visit to a military unit in 1995, Kim Jong-il, the son of Kim Il-sung, introduced  as "a revolutionary idea of attaching great importance to the army" and "a politics emphasizing the perfect unity and the single-hearted unity of the party, army and the people, and the role of the army as the vanguards". This was a shift from the government's previous guiding policy, Kim Il-sung's . According to the North Korean government, Kim Jong-il's inspiration for  came from a visit with his father to the Seoul 105th Guards Armored Division headquarters in Pyongyang on 25 August 1960. 25 August is now a national holiday, the Day of Songun.

A 1997 editorial published in Rodong Sinmun, the official newspaper of the Workers' Party of Korea, stated, "Never before have the status and role of the People's Army been so extraordinarily elevated as today when it is being led energetically by the Respected and Beloved Comrade Supreme Commander". By this point, the Korean People's Army had also become "synonymous with the people, the state, and the party".

In 1998,  began appearing in conjunction with other terms, including "military-first revolutionary idea", "military-first revolutionary leadership" and "military-first politics", expanding the concept of  into even more aspects of North Korean governance.

 became an even more prominent concept in January 1999, making its first appearance in the important New Year's Day editorial published jointly by all the major news organs of North Korea. The editorial tied  with Kim Jong-il by declaring that he practiced military-first leadership, which is "one in which the People's Army serves as the main force of revolution and in which the unity of the army and the people helps to safeguard as well as build socialism".

In January 2003, the New Year's editorial added military-first ideology to the pantheon of military-first concepts. In December 2003, the "Essential Attributes of Military-First Politics" was published as a new vision of the driving force of the revolution in the quasi-communist North Korea. It assigned the main force of the revolution to the Korean People's Army. This is a role that in communist states is traditionally assigned to the proletariat, or in China to the peasantry. However, for North Korea "only the army meets the criteria of loyalty, revolutionary spirit, cohesiveness, and ".

 has continued to expand in importance and is even now included in the ideological discussion of reunification with South Korea. The North Korean press stated: "[S]ongun politics is the guarantee that will secure the re-unification of the Fatherland". North Korea also credits Songun with safeguarding the peace on the peninsula and claims that it is the only thing preventing the United States from attacking North Korea. Songun has become intrinsic to North Korea's domestic politics, foreign policy and decision-making, making a place alongside Juche as a guiding principle of the state.

According to author Suki Kim's memoir of her time teaching at Pyongyang University of Science and Technology, there are twelve "Wonders of Songun": The sunrise at Mount Paektu (the alleged birthplace of Kim Jong-il); the winter pine trees at the Dabaksol guard post (where Kim Jong-il supposedly launched the  policy); the Cheollyeong azaleas (a "frontline" hill where Kim Jong-il visited often); the evening view of Jangji Mountain near the Changja River (a refuge for a young Kim Jong-il during the Korean War); the sound of the Ullim Waterfall in the mountains above Munchon, Kangwon Province (as it is the sound of a "powerful and prosperous nation"); the horizon at Handurebol (the Handure Plain in Taechon County) for this was the location of Kim Jong-il's land reform in 1998 after the famine; Taehongdan County's large fields of potato flowers (Kim Il-sung is said to have fought the Japanese here and Kim Jong-il turned it into the country's largest potato farm); the area around the mountain village of Beoman-ri in Sohung County, North Hwanghae Province (Kim Jong-il rebuilt the village after the famine and is claimed as the "pride of a communist country"); the bean (or nut) farming program Kim Jong-un instituted to provide food for the military; the large rice farm in Migok, Sariwon; the Taedonggang fruit farm in Pyongyang; and the Ryongjung fish farm in South Hwanghae Province. A thirteenth "wonder" is reported to have been created in 2016. The first nine of these sites have been heavily promoted by North Korean authorities and have become tourist destinations.

Rationale 

Two reasons have been offered as to why after Kim Il-sung's death North Korea shifted to Songun as a major ideology. One strand of the debate points to North Korea's desire to increase its military strength due to its precarious international position. In this sense, Songun is perceived as an aggressive, threatening move to increase the strength of the North Korean military at the expense of other parts of society.

This argument also often points to the series of crises that befell North Korea in the early 1990s, beginning with the fall of its long-time ally the Soviet Union in 1991, followed by the death of Kim Il-sung (1994), several natural disasters, the North Korean famine and economic crisis, all before 1999. These also could have served as motivation for a new method of consolidation of power.

The second strand focuses on internal North Korean politics as the cause for the move to military-first politics. When Kim Il-sung died, he left leadership of North Korea to his son, Kim Jong-il. At the time of his father's death, the most important position held by Kim Jong-il in the North Korean government was military, specifically second in command of the military.

Additionally, in order to keep control of the government Kim Jong-il would need to secure his support base within the Korean People's Army. This line of argument points out that Kim Jong-il deliberately chose to sideline other aspects of the government in order to assert the primacy of the Korean People's Army.

Political implications 

The ascendency of the Korean People's Army concerns South Korea and ties into the debate over the Sunshine Policy, its most recent vision of Korean reunification. Given North Korea's insistence that Songun will facilitate reunification, it is difficult to tell what they expect in the future from South Korea, whose government is not at all supportive of  policies, going so far as to outlaw websites within South Korea that promote North Korea's military-first ideas.

 politics have also thrived on the ongoing nuclear crisis. For the United States, given that its primary concern is the denuclearisation of the peninsula, the concept of military-first politics and ideology is a troubling one.  also seems to fit very well with the possession of nuclear weapons and can be seen as a way of making such weapons central to the government's guiding ideology of self-governance. This leads to the concern that the longer military-first ideology guides the North Korean government, the less likely it will be that the United States will be able to convince North Korea to give up its nuclear weapons programme. A similar concern is that North Korea could perceive attempts at denuclearisation and normalisation of affairs with the United States as a threat to the primacy of the military within North Korea and thus a threat to  ideology, a fear which puts into doubt the idea that North Korea may become willing to give up its nuclear weapons programme.

Economic implications 
"Military-first politics" originated with the attempt at recovery—the "Arduous March"—from the economic troubles during the famine that swept North Korea in the 1990s. In order to overcome the economic crisis, the army was expected to work at the forefront. The government set a strategic goal of becoming "a powerful and prosperous nation" through military-first policy.

See also 

 Byungjin ("parallel development", a term used by Kim Il-sung and Kim Jong-un)
 Conscription
 Guns versus butter model
 Martial law
 Militarism
 Military dictatorship
 Military–industrial complex
 Military Keynesianism
 Park Chung-hee
 Stratocracy
 War economy

References

Citations

Sources 

 Cheong, Wook-sik, "Military First Policy", presented at Washington Peace Network, Washington, D.C., 19 April 2007.
 Chun, Mi-young, "The Kim Jong Il administration's recognition of politics", KINU policy series, September 2006.
 Feffer, John. "Forgotten Lessons of Helsinki: Human Rights and U.S.-North Korean Relations", World Policy Journal, v.XXI, no.3, Fall 2004.
 Platkovskiy, Alexander. Nuclear Blackmail and North Korea's Search for a place in the sun: The North Korean Nuclear Program. New York and London: Routledge, 2000.

Further reading 

 
 
 
 
 
 
 
 

Anti-sadaejuui
Economic ideologies
Economy of North Korea
Government of North Korea
Ideology of the Workers' Party of Korea
Korean nationalism
Left-wing nationalism
Militarism
Political theories
Politics of North Korea